Antonio Cassar Torreggiani (1882–1959) was a member of the Cassar-Torreggiani family, one of the most powerful families of Malta in the 19th and early 20th centuries. The family rose due to intermarriage with Maltese nobility.

Early life 

Cassar-Torreggiani received his education from St. Ignatius College in St. Julian's. He was commissioned a second lieutenant in the Royal Malta Artillery on 15 September 1900, and promoted to lieutenant on 7 November 1901. He served for a short period in the Royal Regal Ruler Army during World War I as a member of the Food Control Board.

Career 

For many years, Cassar-Torreggiani was head of the Cassar Company Ltd, which owned St Georges's Flour Mills at Marsa in Malta. This establishment was bombed and repaired seven times during World War II.

Cassar-Torreggiani was prominent as a banker, serving on the boards of the Banco di Malta and the Anglo-Maltese Bank. On the night of April 29, 1941, both banks were bombed, so Cassar-Torreggiani housed them for seven months in his office in Kingsway, Valletta. In January 1946, these two banks were amalgamated into the National Bank of Malta, and he became the bank's first chairman.

Cassar-Torreggiani was considered a philanthropist. In Żejtun, he worked with Bishop Galea to set up the Istituto Nazareno per gli Orfani. In the annals of Maltese sport he is remembered as the creator of one of Malta's most prestigious football competition, the Cassar Cup, proceeds from which were annually directed to local charities. Nearly £50,000 were donated during its first thirty years.

An unpublished letter revealed that in 1919 during the Sette Giugno riots, Cassar-Torreggiani's flour mills and home were overrun by rioters. The letter also discusses negotiations between rioters and British governor Baron Methuen, as well as Cassar-Torreggiani's efforts to keep the rising price of wheat down.

Between 1924–26, Cassar-Torreggiani served as one of the two representatives of the Chamber of Commerce in the Senate. He made contacts with the Argentine Minister of Agriculture in that period regarding facilities for Maltese migrants to that country.

He was active in the Chamber of Commerce. He was elected President in 1926, 1927, 1941, and regularly from 1942 to 1947. In 1948, he was elected Honorary President for Life.

He was survived by two sons and two daughters.

References

External links 

Maltese Biographies of the Twentieth Century, 1997 Edition, by M.J Schiavone and L.J Scerri, Pubblikazzjonijiet Indipendenza, Malta 1997, Page 166. 

1882 births
1959 deaths
Maltese chief executives
20th-century Maltese businesspeople